Kochaniyan is a 1994 Indian Malayalam film. It was the first film directed by Venganoor. Films tells a Kerala family story through the eyes of the young protagonist Kochunni (Vineeth). In 1994, the film received National Film Award for Best Children's Film.

Cast
 Master Vineeth
 Narendra Prasad
 Maya Uthradamthirunal
 A. Shahudeen
 Baby Surendran
 Master Vishnu Prasad
 Master Anoop RS
 Master Anil Lele

References

External links

1994 films
1990s Malayalam-language films